Charles Archibald Cecil Birkin (30 March 1905 – 7 June 1927) was an English motorcycle racer, brother of Tim Birkin, one of the "Bentley Boys" of the 1920s.

Background and family
Birkin was born into a wealthy Nottingham family in 1905. He was the son of Sir Thomas Stanley Birkin, 2nd Bt. and Hon. Margaret Diana Hopetoun Chetwynd.

Motorcycle racing 
During an early morning practice session for the 1927 Isle of Man TT races, Archie Birkin, riding a 500c McEvoy motor-cycle, crashed fatally at Rhencullen after swerving to avoid a collision with a Fish Van being driven on open roads. From 1928 onwards,  practice sessions for the Isle of Man TT Races and Manx Grand Prix were held on closed public roads.

Sources

1905 births
1927 deaths
Sportspeople from Nottingham
English motorcycle racers
Isle of Man TT riders
Motorcycle racers who died while racing
Sport deaths in the Isle of Man
Younger sons of baronets
Archie